Rocky Islets are part of the Three Islands National Park in Far North Queensland, Australia, in the Coral Sea, 1605 km northwest of Brisbane.

The islands are important and protected seabird nesting sites. Access to the Rocky Islets is prohibited.

See also

 Protected areas of Queensland

References

External links
 Map, nprsr.qld.gov.au 
 About Three Islands Group, nprsr.qld.gov.au

National parks of Far North Queensland
Protected areas established in 1939
Islands on the Great Barrier Reef
1939 establishments in Australia
Islands of Far North Queensland